The Super Prestige Pernod was a season-long competition in road bicycle racing between 1958 and 1987. For the first edition it was known as the Prestige Pernod, and for the last four years as the Super Prestige Pernod International.

History
Disagreements between the organisers of the similar Challenge Desgrange-Colombo led to its demise and a gap in season-long competitions. In 1958, the publicity division of Pernod offered a trophy for the best French rider of the year. The competition was known as the Prestige Pernod. It was a rival to Challenge Yellow, run by the chain company Sedis since 1931.

The following year, Pernod added the Super Prestige Pernod, for the best rider of the year, assessed on points attributed to the biggest races. At the same time it introduced Promotion Pernod, for the best French rider under 25. The Super Prestige Pernod became an unofficial world points championship.

A fourth class, Promotion Internationale, appeared in 1983 but that and the Promotion Pernod vanished the following year to create a single Super Prestige Pernod. A women's competition was added in 1985. Both were abandoned at the end of 1987 when France banned drinks advertising in sport.

The Super Prestige Pernod was won by some of the greatest names in professional cycle racing. They included Jacques Anquetil, who won four times, Eddy Merckx won a record seven times (1969–1975); Bernard Hinault equalled Anquetil's total with his fourth consecutive victory in 1982; while the final four years were won by Irish riders Sean Kelly (1984–1986) and Stephen Roche (1987). Anquetil was the only rider to regain the title having lost it, a feat he achieved twice.

Races

Winners
Source:

See also

 List of road bicycle racing events

Citations

References

External links
 

 
Cycle racing series
Recurring sporting events established in 1958
1958 establishments in France
Recurring sporting events disestablished in 1987
Defunct cycle racing series